The following elections occurred in the year 1939.

 1939 Belgian general election
 1939 Danish Folketing election
 1939 Danish Landsting election
 1939 Finnish parliamentary election
 1939 Honduran presidential election
 1939 Liberian general election
 1939 Papal conclave
 1939 Salvadoran Constitutional Assembly election
 1939 Salvadoran presidential election
 1939 Southern Rhodesian general election

Africa
 1939 Southern Rhodesian general election

Asia
 1939 Iranian legislative election

Australia
 1939 Griffith by-election
 1939 Western Australian state election

Europe

United Kingdom
 1939 Ashton-under-Lyne by-election
 1939 North Cornwall by-election
 1939 Fareham by-election
 1939 Monmouth by-election
 1939 East Norfolk by-election
 1939 Wells by-election
 1939 Westminster Abbey by-election

North America

Canada
 1939 Edmonton municipal election
 1939 New Brunswick general election
 1939 Ottawa municipal election
 1939 Prince Edward Island general election
 1939 Quebec general election
 1939 Toronto municipal election

United States
 1939 New York state election

Oceania

Australia
 1939 Griffith by-election
 1939 Western Australian state election

See also
 :Category:1939 elections

1939
Elections